USS Braine (DD-630), a , was a ship of the United States Navy named for Rear Admiral Daniel L. Braine (1829–1898), who served in the American Civil War.  Constructed by Bath Iron Works in Bath, Maine, the ship was launched on 7 March 1943 and commissioned on 11 May 1943. The destroyer took part in the United States' naval campaign in the South Pacific during World War II. Following the war, the vessel was decommissioned and placed in reserve. During the Korean War, Braine was recommissioned and operated in the Mediterranean Sea before being decommissioned for the final time by the United States Navy in 1971. The destroyer was sold to Argentina and renamed ARA Almirante Domecq Garcia after Admiral Manuel Domecq Garcia and served with the Argentinian Navy until disposed of as a target ship in 1983.

Construction and career
Braine was launched 7 March 1943 by Bath Iron Works Corp., Bath, Maine; sponsored by Mrs. Daniel L. Braine, wife of a grandson of Rear Admiral Braine, and commissioned 11 May 1943.

Departing the United States east coast in the summer of 1943, Braine sailed via San Francisco to Pearl Harbor as an escort for troop transports. She then proceeded directly to Wake Island where she participated in its bombing and bombardment (5–6 October 1943). Between 1 and 3 November, Braine took part in the initial landings in Empress Augusta Bay, Bougainville. During the following two months, she escorted resupply echelons to the Bougainville beachhead.

1944

New Guinea
On 15 February 1944, Braine participated in the Green Island landing. She steamed into Rabaul Harbor under enemy fire for night shore bombardment of enemy installations (24–25 February). On 20 March, she supported landings on Emirau Island, Bismarck Archipelago. Braine spent the ensuing months in escort work and training for the Marianas invasion.

Marianas
On 14 June, she took part in the bombardment of Tinian Island, and received minor damage from a small caliber shell but continued operations in the Marianas until 23 June. After spending almost a month in the United States, she sailed for the Philippines, via Pearl Harbor. Braine rendered fire support during the Leyte landings (20 October), and repelled an enemy air attack on 18 November.

1945

Philippines
From 4 to 15 January 1945, she participated in the Lingayen Gulf landings. Braine then proceeded to Manila Bay to support landings on the Bataan Peninsula and Corregidor (14–28 February 1945). She served as a radar picket and support ship for the landing forces at Zamboanga and subsequently at Pollack Harbor, Mindanao (17 March–23 April).

Okinawa, kamikaze hit
She took part in the Okinawa operations as a radar picket ship (16–25 May). On 27 May, the destroyer was hit in quick succession by two kamikazes. The first hit forward seriously damaged the bridge, and the second hit amidships blew number two funnel overboard and demolished the amidships superstructure. Braine retired to Kerama Retto, Ryukyu Islands, for emergency repairs; departed 19 June; and arrived in the United States 19 July 1945.

Repairs and decommissioning
On 21 July, Braine steamed to Boston for repairs and then proceeded to Charleston Navy Yard for inactivation. She was placed out of commission in reserve 26 July 1946 at Charleston.

1951–1971
Recommissioned 6 April 1951, Braine conducted training in the Atlantic and Caribbean and in the spring of 1952 sailed to the Mediterranean for duty with the 6th Fleet. In October, she returned to duty in coastal waters. She joined the 6th Fleet again in May 1953, and remained until October. Between October 1953 and 2 November 1954, she underwent a yard period, conducted refresher training in the Caribbean, and local operations in the vicinity of Newport. On 30 November 1954, she departed for the Pacific and became a unit of Cruisers-Destroyers Pacific Fleet, in mid-December 1954.

Early in January 1955, she proceeded to Yokosuka, Japan, and joined Task Force 77. Braine participated in the evacuation of the Tachen Islands in February and later operated on the Formosa patrol. She returned to the west coast 19 June 1955.

Braines next departure from the west coast was on 13 February 1956, to conduct another Western Pacific cruise. She returned to California 22 July 1956 and operated in the San Diego and San Francisco areas.

In 1964, Braine was one of several ships that took part in the movie In Harm's Way.

On 17 August 1971, Braine was decommissioned, stricken from the US Navy List, and transferred to Argentina through the Security Assistance Program.

ARA Almirante Domecq Garcia

The Argentine Navy took possession of Braine on 17 August 1971 and renamed her ARA Almirante Domecq Garcia (D23) after Admiral Manuel Domecq Garcia.

Awards
Braine earned nine battle stars for her World War II service.

References

External links

  navsource.org: USS Braine
 hazegray.org: USS Braine
USS Braine archived website

Fletcher-class destroyers of the United States Navy
Ships built in Bath, Maine
1943 ships
World War II destroyers of the United States
Cold War destroyers of the United States
Almirante Domecq Garcia
Cold War destroyers of Argentina